A Decree of the President of the Russian Federation (Ukaz Prezidenta Rossiyskoy Federatsii) or Executive Order (Decree) of the President of Russia is a legal act (ukase) with the status of a by-law made by the President of Russia.

As normative legal acts, such have the status of by-laws in the hierarchy of legal acts (along with Decrees of the Government of the Russian Federation and instructions and directions of other officials). Presidential decrees may not alter existing laws of higher precedence –, the Constitution of Russia, Federal Constitutional Laws, Federal Laws and laws of Russian regions and, till the 2020 Russian constitutional referendum, Russia's international agreements, which now however stand in lower precedence than Presidential Decrees or any other Russian state law or obligation, – and may be superseded by any of these laws.

See also

References

External links

 Acts of the President of Russia
 Archive of decrees prior to 1 May 2010)
  Preparation and execution of projects, acts of the President of the Russian Federation (Russian)

Law of Russia
Presidency of Russia
Public administration
Russia